KBZN (97.9 FM, "Now 97.9") is a commercial radio station licensed to Ogden, Utah and serving the Salt Lake City metropolitan area. The station airs a hot adult contemporary radio format and is owned by Capital Broadcasting.

The station's studios and offices are located at the 257 Tower building in downtown Salt Lake City, along with sister station KLO-FM.  KBZN's transmitter site is located southwest of the city on Farnsworth Peak in the Oquirrh Mountains.  The station is also heard on a repeater station, 97.9 KBZN-1 in Park City and on translator station 103.1 K276DR in Montpelier, Idaho.

History

Country (1978-1989) 
In 1978, the station first signed on as KZAN. The station was owned by Ben Lomand and broadcast a country music format. The station switched call letters to KKGB in 1988.

Top 40 (1989) 
In 1989, the station changed its call sign to KKWY, as a Top 40 station.

Smooth jazz (1989-2009) 
In late 1989, the license was purchased by locally based Capital Broadcasting, changed call letters to KBZN, and became an affiliate of the syndicated Smooth Jazz service known as "The Breeze." For several years it was a locally programmed Smooth Jazz station.

Hot adult contemporary (2009-present) 
In 2009, KBZN made the switch to hot AC and the "Now 97.9" moniker.

References

External links
KBZN - Official website

BZN
Mass media in Salt Lake City
Hot adult contemporary radio stations in the United States